Dajuan Anthony Harris Jr. (born December 11, 2000) is an American college basketball player at the University of Kansas. In 2022, Harris was the starting point guard on the Jayhawks team that won the national championship.

High school career
Harris attended Rock Bridge High School in Columbia, Missouri, where he helped lead the team to two straight Missouri 5A state championship game appearances, finishing runner up in 2018 and winning in 2019. Harris originally committed to playing basketball for Missouri State, but withdrew his commitment, deciding instead to play at the University of Kansas.

College career
Harris redshirted his first year at Kansas. In the 2020–21 season, Harris emerged as a contributor for the Jayhawks, finishing second on the team in assists. For the 2021–22 season Harris became the team's starting point guard and at the end of the season was named a member of the Big 12 All-Defensive team. On February 1, 2022, Harris recorded a career-high 14 points in a 70–61 win over Iowa State. In the 2022 national championship game, Harris had 2 points, 3 assists and a game-high 3 steals. As a junior, he was named Big 12 Defensive Player of the Year.

Career statistics

College

|-
| style="text-align:left;"| 2020–21
| style="text-align:left;"| Kansas
| 30 || 2 || 16.0 || .482 || .643 || .800 || 1.1 || 2.2 || 1.0 || .1 || 2.4
|-
| style="text-align:left;"| 2021–22
| style="text-align:left;"| Kansas
| 40 || 39 || 29.0 || .427 || .323 || .792 || 1.4 || 4.2 || 1.5 || .3 || 5.4
|-
| style="text-align:left;"| 2022–23
| style="text-align:left;"| Kansas
| 3 || 3 || 30.0 || .417 || .167 || 1.000 || 3.0 || 7.7 || 1.0 || 1.3 || 7.3
|- class="sortbottom"
| style="text-align:center;" colspan="2"| Career
|| 73 || 44 || 23.7 || .437 || .366 || .800 || 1.3 || 3.5 || 1.2 || .2 || 4.2

References

External links
Kansas Jayhawks bio
ESPN profile

2000 births
Living people
American men's basketball players
Basketball players from Missouri
Kansas Jayhawks men's basketball players
Point guards
Sportspeople from Columbia, Missouri